Varlamov is a rural locality (a khutor) in Kotlubanskoye Rural Settlement, Gorodishchensky District, Volgograd Oblast, Russia. The population was 622 as of 2010. There are 12 streets.

Geography 
Varlamov is located 40 km northwest of Gorodishche (the district's administrative centre) by road. Kotluban is the nearest rural locality.

References 

Rural localities in Gorodishchensky District, Volgograd Oblast